Funkstar De Luxe (born Martin Aulkjær Ottesen in 1973) is a Danish house producer and remixer. He is best known for his million-selling reworking of Bob Marley's "Sun Is Shining".

Work 
Funkstar was first exposed to Marley's music as a teenage keyboardist in an amateur reggae band. "Sun Is Shining" was a worldwide hit reaching the top 20 in nine countries including No. 3 on the UK Singles Chart. It was also awarded best-selling international reggae single of the year at the World Music Awards.

Longtime Marley manager Chris Blackwell hurried to release his own remixes, but Funkstar had already moved on and had another hit with a remix of Marley's "Rainbow Country." He has since recorded other remixes for artists including Tom Jones, Mary J. Blige, Grace Jones, and Barry White, the most notable of which appeared on "Keep on Movin: It's Too Funky in Here". In 2003, Funkstar released an album of his own material, "Funkturistic".

Dubbed "The Danish King of the Remix" by AllMusic, after two sabbaticals away from the music industry during the 2000s, Funkstar returned to the scene in 2013 charting with a remix of Kim Wilde's "You Keep Me Hanging On".  In 2014, his long-time label Lifted House released a rework of his Marley hit "Sun Is Shining - 15th Anniversary" which reached No. 1 on the UK Dance Chart.

His 2015 single "Million Miles" featured Michael Jackson collaborator Geoffrey Williams. The single reached No. 8 on the British Dance Chart and spent ten weeks in the UK Dance Top 20.

Discography

Albums

Keep On Moving (1999)
Keep On Moving (It's Too Funky in Here) (2000)
I'm a Rainbow too (2000)
Funkturistic (2002)

Singles

See also
List of number-one dance hits (United States)
List of artists who reached number one on the US Dance chart

References

External links 
 
 

Club DJs
Remixers
Danish house musicians
Living people
1973 births
Electronic dance music DJs